Vulturești is a commune in Argeș County, Muntenia, Romania. It is composed of three villages: Bârzești, Huluba and Vulturești. These were part of Hârtiești Commune until 2003, when they were split off.

The commune is located in the eastern part of the county, on the border with Dâmbovița County. The 25th meridian east passes  to the west of Vulturești, while the 45th parallel north passes  to the south.

References

Communes in Argeș County
Localities in Muntenia